Raoul Moretti (1893–1954) was a French composer of film scores. Specialising in light music, he also wrote operettas.

Selected filmography
 King of the Hotel (1932)
 If You Wish It (1932)
 Suburban Melody (1933)
 Sing Anyway (1940)
 Vénus aveugle (1941)
 A Woman in the Night (1943)

References

Bibliography 
 Lamb, Andrew. 150 Years of Popular Musical Theatre. Yale University Press, 2000.

External links 
 Raoul Moretti on data.bnf.fr
 
 Encyclopédie multimédia de la comédie musicale 
 Biographie de Raoul Moretti (en archive)
 Compositeur et orchestrateur Moretti
 27 films liés à Raoul Moretti on Ciné-Ressources.net

Musicians from Marseille
1893 births
1954 deaths
French operetta composers
French film score composers